Lanny Dean Harris (February 21, 1940 – June 16, 1991) was a Major League Baseball umpire who worked in the National League from  to , wearing uniform number 29 during his career. Harris umpired 851 Major League games.

MLB career
Harris was promoted to the National League during the umpire strike of 1979, one of eight umpires promoted to the major leagues at that time. He was discharged by the NL in 1985.

While in the majors, Harris felt the repercussions of having entered the league during the strike. After being hit in the throat by a foul ball during a 1979 game, Harris was examined by a trainer while his three veteran partners did not move from their positions in the field.

Notable games
Harris was thrown to the ground in a brawl involving Mario Soto and Claudell Washington in a 1984 Reds-Braves game.

Death
Harris died from a brain tumor in Indianapolis in 1991 at age 51.

References

1940 births
1991 deaths
Major League Baseball umpires
Sportspeople from Indiana